Abdellah Ezbiri (born 1986) is a French kickboxer. He is the former I.S.K.A. K-1 Rules World Champion and W.K.N. K-1 Rules European Super Lightweight Champion. As of 1 November 2018, he is ranked the #7 featherweight in the world by Combat Press.

Biography and career

Abdellah Ezbiri is a pro kickboxer and member of the France team of Kickboxing, he has received various titles such as Champion of France by 3 times, and he is also a European and World champion in the discipline. He trains at Team Ezbiri, Fighters 69 in Lyon, with his trainer and brother Fouad Ezbiri.

On May 7, 2011, at Fight Zone 5, Abdellah became W.K.N. K-1 Rules European Super Lightweight champion Under 65 kg after beating the Italian Salvatore Zappulla by KO in the 3rd round.

On April 14, 2012, he fought to a draw against Samir "Petit Prince" Mohamed by decision at Fight Zone 6.

He competed in the Glory 8: Tokyo - 2013 65kg Slam in Tokyo, Japan on May 3, 2013, losing to Gabriel Varga via unanimous decision in the quarter-finals.

At La 20ème Nuit des Champions -68.5 kg/151 lb tournament in Marseille, France on November 23, 2013, Ezbiri defeated Charles François on points in the semi-finals before losing to Bruce Codron in the final by the same margin.

Titles and accomplishments

Professional:
2017 Nuit De Champions K-1 Rules Champion (66.000 kg)
2017 Glory Featherweight Contender Tournament Winner
2017 I.S.K.A. 67 kg World Title
2016 Kunlun Fight 65 kg Tournament Runner-up
2014 NDC K-1 Rules -70 kg Tournament Runner-up
2013 NDC K-1 Rules -68.5 kg Tournament Runner-up
2013 I.S.K.A. K-1 Rules World Welterweight Champion (67.000 kg)
2013 Krush Grand Prix Tournament Runner-Up (67.000 kg)
2012 Nuit des Champions Kickboxing K-1 Rules belt (67.000 kg)
2011 F-1 World MAX Tournament Champion (65.000 kg)
2011 W.K.N. K-1 Rules European Super Lightweight Champion (66.700 kg)
2009 F.F.S.C. Kickboxing K-1 Rules French Champion (67.000 kg)
2008 Kickboxing K-1 Rules French Champion
2007 F.F.K.B. Kickboxing K-1 Rules French Champion Class B
Amateur:
 2010 SportAccord World Combat Games Kick-Boxing - Low-Kick, Beijing, China  (-67 kg)
 2009 W.A.K.O. World Kick-Boxing Championships - Low-Kick, Villach, Austria  (-67 kg)

Kickboxing record

|-
|-  bgcolor= "#FFBBBB"
| 2019-10-26|| Loss ||align=left| Zakaria Zouggary || Glory 70: Lyon || Lyon, France || KO (Punches) || 1 || 2:25
|-  style="background:#fbb;"
| 2019-03-09 || Loss||align=left| Anvar Boynazarov || Glory 64: Strasbourg  || Strasbourg, France || Decision (Unanimous) || 3 || 3:00
|-  bgcolor="#CCFFCC"
| 2018-10-20|| Win ||align=left| Victor Pinto || Glory 60: Lyon || Lyon, France || KO (Spinning back kick)|| 1 || 1:03
|-  bgcolor="#FFBBBB"
| 2018-05-12 || Loss ||align=left| Petpanomrung Kiatmuu9 || Glory 53: Lille  || Lille, France || KO (Left high kick) || 2 ||
|-  bgcolor="#CCFFCC"
| 2017-11-25|| Win ||align=left| Masaaki Noiri || Nuit Des Champions 2017 || Marseille, France || Decision|| 5 || 3:00 
|-
! style=background:white colspan=9 |
|-  bgcolor="#CCFFCC"
| 2017-10-28|| Win ||align=left| Anvar Boynazarov || Glory 47: Lyon || Lyon, France || Decision|| 3 || 3:00 
|-
! style=background:white colspan=9 |
|-  bgcolor="#CCFFCC"
| 2017-10-28|| Win ||align=left| Azize Hlali || Glory 47: Lyon  || Lyon, France || Decision|| 3 || 3:00 
|-
! style=background:white colspan=9 |
|-  bgcolor="#CCFFCC"
| 2017-09-04|| Win ||align=left| Mohamed Hendouf || Tiger Night || Switzerland || Decision|| 3 || 3:00 
|-  bgcolor="#CCFFCC"
| 2017-02-18 || Win ||align=left| Giovanni Boyer || La Nuit Des Champions || France || Decision|| 3 || 3:00 
|-
! style=background:white colspan=9 |
|-
|-  bgcolor="#FFBBBB"
| 2016-09-10 || Loss ||align=left| Wei Ninghui || Kunlun Fight 51 - 65 kg 2016 Tournament Final || Fuzhou, China || TKO(Low Kick) || 1 ||  
|-
! style=background:white colspan=9 |
|-  bgcolor="#CCFFCC"
| 2016-09-10 || Win ||align=left| Buray Bozaryilmaz || Kunlun Fight 51 - 65 kg 2016 Tournament Semi-final || Fuzhou, China || Decision|| 3 || 3:00 
|-
|-  bgcolor="#CCFFCC"
| 2016-09-10 || Win ||align=left| Kim Minsoo || Kunlun Fight 51 - 65 kg 2016 Tournament Quarter-finals || Fuzhou, China || Decision|| 3 || 3:00 
|-
|-  bgcolor="#CCFFCC"
| 2016-07-30 || Win ||align=left| Isaac Araya || Kunlun Fight 48 - 65 kg 2016 Tournament 1/8 Finals || Jining, China || Decision|| 3 || 3:00 
|-
|-  bgcolor="#CCFFCC"
| 2016-04-08 || Win ||align=left| Nicola Sanzione || Fight Night 1|| Saint-Étienne, France || Decision|| 3 || 3:00 
|-
|-  bgcolor="#CCFFCC"
| 2016-01-16 || Win ||align=left| Modibo Diarra || Nuit des Champions|| Marseille, France || Decision|| 3 || 3:00 
|-
|-  bgcolor="#CCFFCC"
| 2015-11-14 || Win ||align=left| Edouard Bernardou || Nuit des Champions|| Marseille, France || Decision|| 3 || 3:00 
|-
|-  bgcolor="#FFBBBB"
| 2015-07-18 || Loss ||align=left| Rachid Magmadi || Partouche Kickboxing Tour|| France ||  KO || 1 ||
|-
|-  bgcolor="#CCFFCC"
| 2015-07-18 || Win ||align=left| Tarek Guermoudi || Partouche Kickboxing Tour|| France ||  KO || 3 ||
|-
|-  bgcolor="#CCFFCC"
| 2015-05-16 || Win ||align=left| Johan Labbe || La 21ème Nuit des Champions|| France ||  Decision (Split) || 3 || 3:00
|-
|-  bgcolor="#FFBBBB"
| 2014-11-22 || Loss ||align=left| Sitthichai Sitsongpeenong || La 21ème Nuit des Champions, Final || Marseille, France || TKO (Low kick)  || 2 || 
|-
! style=background:white colspan=9 |
|-
|-  bgcolor="#CCFFCC"
| 2014-11-22 || Win ||align=left| Bruce Codron || La 21ème Nuit des Champions, Semi-finals || Marseille, France ||  Ext. R. Decision (Split) || 4 || 3:00
|-
|-  bgcolor="#FFBBBB"
| 2014-10-05 || Loss ||align=left| Keita Makihira || Krush.46 || Marseilles, France || Decision (Unanimous)|| 3 || 3:00
|-
! style=background:white colspan=9 |
|-  bgcolor="#FFBBBB"
| 2013-11-23 || Loss ||align=left| Bruce Codron || La 20ème Nuit des Champions, Final || Marseilles, France || Decision || 3 || 3:00
|-
! style=background:white colspan=9 |
|-
|-  bgcolor="#CCFFCC"
| 2013-11-23 || Win ||align=left| Charles François || La 20ème Nuit des Champions, Semi-finals || Marseilles, France || Decision || 3 || 3:00
|-
|-  style="background:#fbb;"
| 2013-05-03 || Loss ||align=left| Gabriel Varga || Glory 8: Tokyo || Tokyo, Japan || Decision (unanimous) || 3 || 3:00
|-
! style=background:white colspan=9 |
|-
|- style="" bgcolor=#CCFFCC
| 2013-04-06 || Win ||align=left| Kittisak Noiwibon || Fightzone 7 || Villeurbanne, France || Decision || 5 || 3:00
|-
! style=background:white colspan=9 |
|-
|-  style="background:#fbb;"
| 2013-01-14 || Loss ||align=left| Yuta Kubo || Krush Grand Prix 2013 ~67 kg Tournament~, Final || Tokyo, Japan || Extension round decision (unanimous) || 5 || 3:00
|-
! style=background:white colspan=9 |
|-
|- style="" bgcolor=#CCFFCC
| 2013-01-14 || Win ||align=left| Yuya Yamamoto || Krush Grand Prix 2013 ~67 kg Tournament~, Semi-finals || Tokyo, Japan || Extension round decision (split) || 4 || 3:00
|-
|- style="" bgcolor=#CCFFCC
| 2013-01-14 || Win ||align=left| Yūji Nashiro || Krush Grand Prix 2013 ~67 kg Tournament~, Quarter-finals || Tokyo, Japan || Decision (Unanimous) || 3 || 3:00
|-
|-  bgcolor="#CCFFCC"
| 2012-11-24 || Win ||align=left| Samir Mohamed || Nuit des Champions || Marseilles, France || Decision || 3 || 3:00
|-
! style=background:white colspan=9 |
|-
|-  style="background:#fbb;"
| 2012-06-08 || Loss ||align=left| Yuta Kubo || Krush.19|| Tokyo, Japan || Decision|| 3 || 3:00
|-
|-  bgcolor="#c5d2ea"
| 2012-04-14 || Draw ||align=left| Samir Mohamed || Fightzone 6 || Villeurbanne, France || Decision draw || 5 || 2:00
|-
|-  bgcolor="#CCFFCC"
| 2011-10-01 || Win ||align=left| Loris Audoui || F-1 World MAX Tournament, Final || Meyreuil, France || Decision || 3 || 2:00
|-
! style=background:white colspan=9 |
|-
|-  bgcolor="#CCFFCC"
| 2011-10-01 || Win ||align=left| Vang Moua || F-1 World MAX Tournament, Semi-finals || Meyreuil, France || Decision || 3 || 2:00
|-
|-  bgcolor="#CCFFCC"
| 2011-10-01 || Win ||align=left| Tristan Benard || F-1 World MAX Tournament, Quarter-finals || Meyreuil, France || Decision || 3 || 2:00
|-
|- style="" bgcolor=#CCFFCC
| 2011-05-07 || Win ||align=left| Filippo Soleid || Fightzone 5 || Villeurbanne, France || KO || 3 || 
|-
! style=background:white colspan=9 |
|-
|- style="" bgcolor=#CCFFCC
| 2011-01-22 || Win ||align=left| Tekin Ergun || Kickboxing Gala || Strasbourg, France || Decision || 5 || 3:00
|-
|-  style="background:#fbb;"
| 2010-12-18 || Loss ||align=left| Miodrag Olar || Kickboxing Tournament || La Ciotat, France || Decision || 3 || 2:00
|-
|-  bgcolor="#CCFFCC"
| 2010-09-10 || Win ||align=left| Milan Jovanovic || SportAccord || Beijing, China || Decision (3-0) || 3 || 2:00
|-
! style=background:white colspan=9 |
|-
|-  style="background:#fbb;"
| 2010-09-10 || Loss ||align=left| Shamil Abdulmedjidov || SportAccord World Combat Games, -67 kg, Low-Kick, Semi-finals || Beijing, China || Decision (3-0) || 3 || 2:00
|-
! style=background:white colspan=9 |
|-
|- style="" bgcolor=#CCFFCC
| 2010-05-22 || Win ||align=left| Olivier Surveillant || Kickboxing National Gala || Saint-Joseph, Réunion || Decision ||  || 
|-
|-  style="background:#fbb;"
| 2010-04-24 || Loss ||align=left| Charles François || Fightzone 4 || Villeurbanne, France || Decision || 5 || 3:00
|-
|-  bgcolor="#CCFFCC"
| 2009-11-14 || Win ||align=left| Geoffrey Mocci || La Nuit des Champions 2009 || Marseille, France || Decision || 5 || 3:00
|-
|-  bgcolor="#CCFFCC"
| 2009-10-22 || Win ||align=left| Roland Mendez || W.A.K.O. World Championships, LK men -67 kg, 1/8 Final || Villach, Austria || Decision (2-1) || 3 || 2:00
|-
|-  bgcolor="#CCFFCC"
| 2009-10-22 || Win ||align=left| Simon Laszlo || W.A.K.O. World Championships, LK men -67 kg, 1/16 Final || Villach, Austria || Decision (3-0) || 3 || 2:00
|-
|-  bgcolor="#CCFFCC"
| 2009-06-26 || Win ||align=left| Vang Moua || Gala International Multi-Boxes || Paris, France || Decision || 3 || 3:00
|-
|-  style="background:#fbb;"
| 2009-05-23 || Loss ||align=left| Ismaël Doumbia || Shock Muay 2 || Saint-Denis, France || TKO ||  || 
|-
|-  bgcolor="#CCFFCC"
| 2009-04-25 || Win ||align=left| Vang Moua || F.F.S.C.D.A. French Championships || Paris, France || Decision || 5 || 2:00
|-
! style=background:white colspan=9 |
|-
|-  bgcolor="#CCFFCC"
| 2009-03-01 || Win ||align=left| Nizar Gallas || F.F.S.C.D.A. French Championships, 1/4 Final || France || Decision ||  || 
|-
|-  style="background:#fbb;"
| 2008-11-15 || Loss ||align=left| Max Dansan || VXS 1 || Apt, France || KO || 2 || 
|-
|-  bgcolor="#CCFFCC"
| 2008-04-26 || Win ||align=left| Lyess Maroc || Fight Zone 2 || Villeurbanne, France || KO ||  || 
|-
|-
| colspan=9 | Legend:

See also 
List of male kickboxers

References

1986 births
Living people
French male kickboxers
Lightweight kickboxers
Welterweight kickboxers
French Muay Thai practitioners
French sportspeople of Algerian descent
Kunlun Fight kickboxers
Sportspeople from Lyon
Glory kickboxers